Šaratice is a municipality and village in Vyškov District in the South Moravian Region of the Czech Republic. It has about 1,100 inhabitants.

History
The first written mention of Šaratice is from 1209.

Mineral water
Šaratice is known for the mineral water Šaratica with laxative effects. The water is bottled since 1896.

Gallery

References

External links

Villages in Vyškov District